Kalukapuge Don David (born 1 September 1913 – died 10 September 1987 as ඩේවිඩ් ධර්මකීර්ති), popularly known as David Dharmakeerthi was an actor Sri Lankan early Sri Lankan cinema.

Personal life
He was born on 1 September 1913 in Kotigamgoda village, Padukka. His father Odiris Appuhami was a farmer. He started school at village school and then from Wonakal College, Padukka and finally to the English English School in Homagama. After school, Dharmakeerthi first joined the Department of Agriculture at Alston Place, Colombo as an overseer.

Dharmakeerthi was married to Nandawathi Jayasuriya. The couple has 5 sons and 3 daughters. He died on 10 September 1987 at the age of 74.

Cinema career
In school times, he performed in a drama based on a novel "Rohini" written by Martin Wickremasinghe. There was a superintendent named Jasinghe in the Department of Agriculture where David worked. He saw Dharmakeerthi's acting skills in the dramas of the peasant army, who also produced the background music and art direction. Raja Tilakaratne, who was a Lake House Dinamina Journalist, is a relative of the superintendent Jasinghe. Jasinghe opened the cinema door to Dharmakeerthi. His first cinema acting came through 1953 film Sujatha directed by T. R. Sundaram. During his visit to the studio in India to film Sujatha, his father and friend T. Somasekaran both died.

He also worked as a film assistant director, dialogue writer and a story writer in 1958 film Salli Malli Salli. In this film he emerged as a character actor. In 1981, he acted in the film Aradhana as a merciful father. He won the Best Supporting Actor Award at the 1982 Sarasaviya Awards. for that acting. This was the only award he received in 35 years of film career. He acted with his son Sarath Dharmakeerthi in the 1984 film Parasathuro.

His final cinema appearance came through 1988 film Sagara Jalaya Madi Handuwa Oba Sanda directed by Sumitra Peries.

Political career
His favorite political character was Philip Gunawardena. Dharmakeerthi contested for the Horana seat from the Mahajana Eksath Peramuna in the 1960 general election. However, he was placed third in the seat and received only 1555 votes.

Filmography

References

External links
 හොරණ ඉන්ද්‍රදාසට මත ගැටුම් වැඩිවෙයි! 
 හින්දි චිත්‍රපටයක් කොපිකර ලංකාවේ නැගලා ගිය ‘සුජාතා’
 අපේ කලා ලෝකයෙන් අප්‍රකට කතා
 කිසිම චිත්‍රපටයක කොටස් කපන්නේ නෑ...

1913 births
1987 deaths
Sri Lankan male film actors
Sinhalese male actors
Sinhalese politicians